Valle Verde Early College High School is a high school located in El Paso, Texas. Students graduate from high school with both a high school diploma and an associate degree from El Paso Community College. As an early college high school, VVECHS is a school that boasts students of a high academic rigor, who are chosen to be best suited for the task of taking high school and college courses in tandem.

History 
Valle Verde Early College High School opened on August 27, 2007. 125 students were accepted the first year with five teachers on staff. The students successfully finished the year with a 100% passing average on the reading TAKS, something no other high school in the Ysleta Independent School District has ever achieved. On August 25, 2008 a new class of 108 students was introduced, making the estimated number of students 233, since some students were not allowed to return the following year due to not being able to keep up with the intense teaching environment. The second class also achieved a 100% passing average on the reading TAKS. As of August 23, 2010 there are four classes (9th Grade, 10th Grade, etc.) with a total of 383 students currently attending VVECHS, typical of a North American secondary school.

Campus
The school is located on El Paso Community College's Valle Verde campus, just south of Interstate 10 at Hawkins and North Loop. Classes are currently held in portable classrooms, there are currently no plans to construct a purpose-built structure on the school campus.

Curriculum
Students take high school and college courses concurrently. Students may choose to pursue an Associate of Arts Degree, Associate of Science Degree or Associate of Arts in Teaching Degree.

Intramural activities
Texas Early College High Schools do not offer the traditional high school extracurricular activities, such as sports, and prefers to focus on a rigorous academic curriculum instead. Students are expected to participate in at least one of the numerous intramural activities offered. Student groups and activities at Valle Verde include  Academic Decathlon, Art Club, Book Club, Chaos Order Math Club, Class of 2019, Class, Comedy Club, Drama Club, Glee Club, French Club, Environmental Club, FBLA, High Q, National Honor Society, Learning About Science and Engineering Research (science club), Lifetime Activities Club, National Science Bowl, Robotics Team, Social Studies, Spartan Literary Magazine, Spartan Webmasters, SHPE, Stra-Te-Go, Student Council, UIL Math, VVTV, and Yearbook.

References

External links

El Paso Community College - Early College High School

Educational institutions established in 2007
High schools in El Paso, Texas
Ysleta Independent School District high schools
Early College High Schools
2007 establishments in Texas